The Body Farm is a British television police procedural crime drama series for the BBC network from 13 September until 18 October 2011, which is a spin-off from the cold case police procedural drama Waking the Dead, and was commissioned following the series' closure. The series focuses on the work of Dr. Eve Lockhart, who originally appeared in Waking the Dead from 2007 to 2011. On 30 January 2012, the BBC confirmed that the show would not be returning for a second series.

The series was released on DVD on 24 October 2011, in a three-disc set. The DVD release features an extended cut of episode one, running 94 minutes and including material not broadcast on the television. The DVD was released in conjunction with BBC Worldwide and 2|Entertain.

Premise
The programme features a fictional private forensic pathology facility that conducts scientific research to help solve crimes, led by Dr. Eve Lockhart, played by Tara Fitzgerald.

Cast
 Doctor Eve Lockart – Tara Fitzgerald: Having appeared as part of the cold case unit in Waking the Dead, Eve is no stranger to bodies. And being able to head up her own unit for the first time allows her a sense of freedom, also. Having re-located her body farm since Waking the Dead, Eve is now working from a disused farm building, which has allowed for the expansion of her unit. 
 Detective Inspector Craig Hale – Keith Allen: Hale is the grumpy copper who no scientist wants to deal with. He's arrogant, inefficient and generally uptight when it comes to funding them. But he and Eve strike a special bond, and before long, work in tandem to locate and bring suspects to justice. By the end of the series, he appears to have grown to Eve in his own special way.
 Doctor Mike Collins – Mark Bazeley: Mike is Eve's right-hand man. Calm, tactful and methodical, Mark has the ability to keep cool in tough situations, yet still retrieve the vital evidence required to help Eve with the case. It is suggested that Mike had worked with Eve sometime before the events of the Body Farm, and that the pair share a very open-ended friendship in the unit.
 Doctor Rosa Gilbert – Wunmi Mosaku: Rosa is the most scientifically minded of the entire team, and generally focuses most of her life in attempting to forward science through new methods and ideas. Rosa is, however, the most inexperienced in the field, having only just left university and therefore new to the physical and more demanding side of the investigations.
 Doctor Oscar 'Oggy' Traynor – Finlay Robertson: Oggy is the crazy one of the group. His time spent staring at trees and speaking to plants appear to give him the inside knowledge to be able to crack a case just when Eve is on the verge of discovering the suspect. Although he tends to spend most of his time at the Body Farm, he does occasionally join his colleagues in the field.

Production
An initial six-part run was announced in January 2011, and filming began in March 2011. The programme was filmed in rural Macclesfield and urban Manchester. Episode three was filmed in the fishing village of Staithes, Cleveland. A brief trailer was shown following the final episode of Waking the Dead.

Episodes

Viewing figures
The series began airing on 13 September 2011, with the first episode gaining a strong 6.3 million viewers. By the end of the series, ratings had dropped to 4.6 million.

References

External links

2011 British television series debuts
2011 British television series endings
2010s British drama television series
2010s British mystery television series
BBC television dramas
2010s British television miniseries
2010s British crime television series
English-language television shows
Forensic science in popular culture
Waking the Dead (TV series)